Stumm (German for "mute") is a German language surname from a nickname for a mute Person. Notable people with the name include:
 Chasteen C. Stumm (1848–1895), African American journalist, minister, and teacher
 Elizabeth Stumm (1857–?), African-American teacher and journalist
 Fabian Stumm (1981), German actor
 Jacob Stumm (1853–1921), Australian politician
 Jennifer Stumm, American classical violist
 Sophie von Stumm (1983), British German professor of psychology
 Werner Stumm (1924–1999), Swiss chemist

References 

German-language surnames
Surnames from nicknames